Eastern Russia may refer to:

Siberia
Russian Far East
North Asia